Dr. Shivpujan Rai was an Indian independence activist. During the 1942 Quit India Movement, under Rai's leadership a group of independence fighters hoisted the tricolor flag of India at Mohammadabad Tehsil. In doing so Shivpujan Rai,
Rishishewar Rai, Vans Narayan Rai, Ram Badan Upadhyay, Raj Narayan Rai, Narayan Rai, Vashishtha Narain Rai and Bans Narain Rai sacrificed their life for India's independence on 18 August 1942. All of them are known as Ashta Shaheed (Eight Martyrs) of Sherpur.

Biography

Early life
Dr. Shivpujan Rai was born in a Bhumihar  family in the year of 1913 in Sherpur village of Ghazipur district.

Life as independence activist
Shivpujan Rai was elected as General Secretary of District Congress Committee in 1942.

Martyrdom at Mohammadabad
During Quit India movement Dr. Shivpujan Rai led a group of young independence activists to tehsil head quarter at Mohammadabad and tried to hoist tricolour at tehsil building. He was warned by armed British officers but Shivpujan Rai moved forward with tricolour in hand. Tehsildar fired on him with his service revolver but the young freedom fighter didn't stop. After receiving five bullets in the chest he fell down and sacrificed his life in a very young age of 29 years.

Legacy

References

Indian independence activists
1910 births
1942 deaths
People from Ghazipur